The Dr. Walter Kennedy House is a historic home in Sarasota, Florida. It is located at 1876 Oak Street. On April 14, 1994, it was added to the U.S. National Register of Historic Places.

References and external links

  Laurel Park National Register of Historic Places District 
 Sarasota County listings at National Register of Historic Places
 Sarasota County listings at Florida's Office of Cultural and Historical Programs

Houses on the National Register of Historic Places in Sarasota County, Florida
Houses in Sarasota, Florida
Mission Revival architecture in Florida
Spanish Revival architecture in Florida
Houses completed in 1926